Roos Jasmijn Abels is a Dutch fashion model. She debuted as a Prada exclusive. At a young age, 14 years old, she courted controversy as to whether models under 16 should be allowed on the runway. She is ranked as a "Money Girl" on models.com. Vogue has compared her to top models Caroline Trentini, Natalia Vodianova, Gemma Ward, and Jessica Stam.

Career
Abels was discovered in Amsterdam by former model Kim Akkerman and immediately signed to Brave Model Management. She walked in 40 shows during the F/W 2016 season, including Fendi (semi-exclusive), Versace, Lanvin, Chloé, Louis Vuitton, Céline Armani Privé, Versace, and Marni; and appeared in campaigns for Gucci and Dior. She has also appeared in ads for Emporio Armani, Prada, Calvin Klein, Zara, Mango, Emilio Pucci, and Coach New York.

Abels has appeared in editorials for W, Love magazine, Vogue Italia, Vogue Paris, Vogue Australia, and Vogue China.

References

Living people
1999 births
Dutch female models
IMG Models models
Prada exclusive models